Taekwondo was contested at the 2017 Summer Universiade from August 20 to 26 at the Taoyuan Arena in Taoyuan at the metropolitan area of Taipei, Taiwan.

Medal summary

Medal table

Men's events

Women's events

Mixed events

References

External links
2017 Summer Universiade – Taekwondo
Result book – Taekwondo

Universiade
2017 Summer Universiade events
2017